Woodcliff Lake may refer to:

 the borough of Woodcliff Lake, New Jersey
 Woodcliff Lake Reservoir, located in the above municipality
 Woodcliff Lakes, Nebraska, community south of Fremont, Nebraska